Euphorbia biselegans is a species of plant in the family Euphorbiaceae. It is endemic to Tanzania. It is threatened by habitat loss.

References

Endemic flora of Tanzania
biselegans
Vulnerable plants
Taxonomy articles created by Polbot